Muaythai was contested at the 2009 Asian Indoor Games in Ho Chi Minh City, Vietnam from 3 November to 7 November.  The competition took place at Rạch Miễu Gymnasium.

Medalists

Men

Women

Medal table

Results

Men

51 kg

54 kg

57 kg

60 kg

67 kg

71 kg

Women

51 kg

54 kg

60 kg

References
 Official site

2009 Asian Indoor Games events
2009
Indoor Games
Indoor Games